Dudley Maurice Newitt FRS (28 April 1894 – 14 March 1980) was a British chemical engineer who was awarded the Rumford Medal in 1962 in recognition of his 'distinguished contributions to chemical engineering'.

Newitt was born in London and started working as an assistant chemist for Nobel in Scotland.  In the First World War, he served in the East Surrey Regiment and was awarded the Military Cross.

He married Aliex Schaeffer in 1919, but she died in childbirth in 1923, and the baby was stillborn.  In 1933, he married Doris Garrod, and they had a son and a daughter.

In 1921, he gained a first class Bachelor of Science in chemistry from the Royal College of Science in London, and went on to postgraduate studies in chemical engineering at Imperial College, London. During the Second World War, he was scientific director  of Special Operations Executive responsible for the development of technology for sabotage and espionage.  During this period he was elected a Fellow of the Royal Society.

In 1945, he was appointed as professor of chemical engineering at Imperial College. By 1952, he was made the Head of Department, being responsible for the new building (completed 1967).  He was appointed pro-rector of the college in 1956 until his retirement in 1961.  He died 14 March 1980 in Farnham, Surrey.

References

Further reading
Biography of Professor Dudley Maurice Newitt, written by Professor Malyn Newitt.  Available in three volumes:  
India, Mesopotamia, Palestine (1894 - 1919)
Marriage, The Royal Society and SOE. The Making of 'Q'. (1919 -1945)
The Scientist in the Public Domain.  Imperial College, The Roving Ambassador for Science and Retirement. (1945 - 1980)

British chemical engineers
Academics of Imperial College London
Alumni of Imperial College London
Engineering academics
1894 births
1980 deaths
Fellows of the Royal Society
Recipients of the Military Cross